The least pygmy squirrel (Exilisciurus exilis), also known as the plain pygmy squirrel, is a species of rodent in the family Sciuridae. This plain olive-brown squirrel is endemic to forests, mostly below an altitude of  but locally significantly higher, on the Southeast Asian islands of Borneo, Sumatra and Banggi.

References

Exilisciurus
Rodents of Malaysia
Rodents of Indonesia
Mammals of Brunei
Mammals of Borneo
Taxonomy articles created by Polbot
Mammals described in 1838
Taxa named by Salomon Müller